Carl Michael Edwards II (born August 15, 1979) is an American former professional stock car racing driver. He last competed in the NASCAR Sprint Cup Series, driving the No. 19 Toyota Camry for Joe Gibbs Racing. Prior to that, he drove the No. 99 Ford Fusion for Roush Fenway Racing. He won the 2007 NASCAR Busch Series championship and nearly won the 2011 NASCAR Sprint Cup Series title, but lost by a tiebreaker to Tony Stewart. Edwards is well known for doing a backflip off his car to celebrate his victories.

Early life
Edwards was born on August 15, 1979 in Columbia, Missouri. He graduated from Rock Bridge High School in 1997. Edwards initially did not plan to attend college, but he received some state assistance and decided to attend the University of Missouri in his hometown of Columbia. After three semesters studying engineering, Edwards decided that university attendance was not working as he pursued his career goals in racing.  Prior to becoming a full-time driver, Edwards was working as a substitute teacher while pursuing his racing career.

Racing career

NASCAR

Edwards' big break came in 2002, when he competed in seven NASCAR Craftsman Truck Series events for MB Motorsports. His best finish in the seven races was eighth at Kansas Speedway. He also ran one Busch Series race for Bost Motorsports, finishing 38th at Gateway International Raceway. However, it was enough to impress Jack Roush, and Edwards became a full-time Truck Series competitor for Roush Racing in 2003, driving the No. 99 Ford F-150, and won his first race at Kentucky. He won Rookie-of-the-Year honors in addition to three race wins, eventually finishing eighth in the points standings at the end of the season. In 2004, he notched three more race wins, including the season-opening Florida Dodge Dealers 250 at the Daytona International Speedway. At season's end, Edwards finished fourth in the points. In August 2004, he made his Nextel Cup Series debut, replacing Jeff Burton, who left the team, in the No. 99 Ford Taurus for Roush Racing, at the Michigan International Speedway. He finished 10th. He drove the No. 99 Ford for the remainder of the 2004 Nextel Cup. He also once again ran one Busch Series race; this time for Robby Benton's RAB Racing team at Bristol Motor Speedway.

2005
In 2005, Edwards became a full-time driver in both the Nextel Cup and Busch Series; although he had already ran races in each in prior seasons. Shortly into the season, on March 19, 2005, Edwards made history in the process of winning. First, Edwards won the Aaron's 312 at the Atlanta Motor Speedway in Hampton, Georgia, recording his first Busch Series win. The next day, he beat Jimmie Johnson by 2 hundredths of a second to win the Golden Corral 500 at the same track for his first Nextel Cup Series win. Until this took place, no driver had ever won both the Busch and Nextel Cup Series races in the same weekend at Atlanta, although the feat had been pulled off numerous times before at other tracks by other drivers. Also, Edwards became the first driver in NASCAR history to pick up his first career Busch and Nextel Cup Series wins in the same weekend and became the 11th driver in NASCAR history to win races in all three of the organization's major racing series. 

On June 12, 2005, Edwards picked up his second Nextel Cup win by taking the checkered flag at the Pocono 500 at the Pocono Raceway in Long Pond, Pennsylvania. The weekend was somewhat bittersweet for Edwards, as the Busch Series race at the Nashville Superspeedway in Lebanon, Tennessee had been rained out the night before, and rescheduled for the same day. Also, qualifying for that race had been rained out, and in NASCAR, when qualifying is rained out, the starting grid is set by owner points. Through this process, Edwards was awarded pole, but Hank Parker Jr. ended up driving the car to a 20th-place finish. Since Edwards did not start the race he was not awarded any points, and as such lost a 74-point lead in Busch Series points and dropped to fourth in the standings; Edwards never recovered from the missed race and finished the season third in points, well behind series champion Martin Truex Jr. Edwards got his third win of 2005 on October 30 in the Bass Pro Shops MBNA 500 at Atlanta Motor Speedway, sweeping both of the Nextel Cup races at Atlanta for the 2005 season.

Edwards got his fourth win, at Texas, and became the tenth different driver to win at that track, and the fifth to win there for Roush Racing. By finishing the remainder of the 2004 season in the No. 99 car, he was not eligible to compete for the Cup Series Rookie of the Year, but did win the 2005 Busch Series Rookie of the Year; he finished third in the Cup standings (with teammate Greg Biffle actually winning the tiebreaker for second by virtue of his series-best six wins).

2006: Missing The Chase And 1st Winless Season
In 2006, Edwards and Roush Fenway Racing struggled to keep up with the competition. Edwards did not win a race in 2006, but did manage to score 20 Top 10's. His best finishes came at Michigan, Loudon, and Dover in the fall where he finished second. At the Chevy Rock and Roll 400 in Richmond, he missed the chase by getting wrecked and finished 35th three laps down.

2007: Return To The Chase
On May 18, 2007, Edwards won the pole for the 2007 Nextel Open, and while he led almost the entire 40 lap race, he faded to third in the last few laps, just missing the feature event. On June 17, 2007 Carl Edwards broke his 52-race winless streak in the Nextel Cup by winning the Citizens Bank 400. Shortly thereafter, on July 23, he dislocated his thumb in an eleven car pileup at a late model race at Nebraska Raceway Park (formerly I-80 Speedway) near Lincoln, Nebraska. Edwards won his second race of the 2007 season, and sixth career Cup race, at the Sharpie 500 at Bristol Motor Speedway on August 25.  During the post-race interview on Victory Lane, Edwards commented on the race, saying, "This is the biggest win of my career".  At the conclusion of the first 26 races, the 2007 "regular season", Edwards ranked sixth in overall standings, with 3372 points, 477 points behind overall points leader Jeff Gordon.  Edwards entered the 2007 Chase for the Nextel Cup in fourth place, with 5020 points, based on his two wins in the 2007 season, clinching a spot in the Chase after his win at the Sharpie 500 at Bristol. Edwards struggled through the Chase despite winning at Dover during the Chase. The Hendrick duo of Jimmie Johnson and Jeff Gordon dominated the Chase for the Championship winning six of the 10 races and finishing No. 1 and No. 2 in the final 2007 standings. Edwards finished ninth in the final 2007 standings. 

On November 3, 2007, Edwards clinched his first NASCAR Busch Series Championship by finishing 11th at the O'Reilly Challenge. This came despite struggling in the second half of the Busch Series season. Edwards became the 19th different Busch Series Champion in the 26 years of the modern-era series.

2008
The 2008 season was Edwards' strongest year, finishing second to Jimmie Johnson in the NASCAR Sprint Cup Series. Edwards won the 2008 Auto Club 500, his first Sprint Cup win of the year. The following week, Edwards won the UAW-Dodge 400 at Las Vegas Motor Speedway, his first back to back victories since 2005 when he won in Atlanta and Texas. These victories put Edwards at the top of the point standings for the first time in his career.

Following the Las Vegas win, on March 5, 2008, NASCAR penalized Edwards, owner Jack Roush, and crew chief Bob Osborne for violations found in post-race inspection. The No. 99 car driven by Edwards was found to be in violation of sections 12-4-A, 12-4-Q, and 20–2.1J of the 2008 NASCAR rulebook, specifically, the cover was off the oil tank. The violations were found during post-race inspection at Las Vegas Motor Speedway on March 2. The following penalties were levied by NASCAR: Edwards was fined 100 driver points and stripped his 10 bonus points for the Las Vegas win which would be used to seed him in the Chase for Championship (should he make the Chase). Roush was fined 100 owner points and Osborne was suspended for six races and fined $100,000. Edwards was leading the Kobalt Tools 500 looking for his third consecutive victory, but on lap 274 his car began to smoke and his crew diagnosed the problem as a broken transmission. Edwards went on to finish 42nd. On April 7, he won the Samsung 500 at Texas Motor Speedway for his third win of the season.

On May 2, Edwards announced that he had signed a multi-year contract to remain with Roush Fenway Racing. On August 3, Edwards got his fourth NASCAR Sprint Cup victory of the season, surviving a rain delay and fuel shortage to win at Pocono. On August 17, Edwards dominated the 3M Performance 400 at Michigan International Speedway capturing his fifth win of the season and surpassing his career high season win total of four in 2005. On August 24, Edwards earned another victory by winning the Sharpie 500 at Bristol Motor Speedway.  The win was his second consecutive and sixth of the season.  He did a bump and run on Kyle Busch in the closing laps to take the win from the dominant driver of the night. Busch showed his displeasure with Edwards after the race by driving into the side of Edwards' car, after which Edwards retaliated by spinning Kyle out. On October 26, Edwards earned his seventh victory of the season with a win in the Pep Boys Auto 500 at Atlanta. On November 2, Edwards tied Kyle Busch for the series wins lead by winning his second Dickies 500 at Texas, his eighth win of the season. He reduced his deficit in the points to 106 behind Jimmie Johnson. On November 9 at Phoenix, Edwards finished fourth behind race winner Johnson, who by virtue of the win and the 10 bonus points he earned for leading one lap and the most laps took a 141-point lead over Edwards. Edwards won the season finale at Homestead to take over the series wins lead for the season, extending his career high win total to nine. However, he did not finish far ahead enough of Johnson to take the Sprint Cup championship, as Johnson finished fifteenth and led at least one lap to win the championship by 69 points over Edwards.

2009: 2nd Winless Season
Heading into the 2009 NASCAR Sprint Cup Season, many media analysts expected Edwards to challenge Johnson for the championship.

In the No. 99 car, on the final lap of the 2009 Aaron's 499 at Talladega in April, Edwards survived one of the most violent crashes in NASCAR history. Heading into the tri-oval with the lead, Edwards turned down into Brad Keselowski's path. Keselowski touched, and Edwards spun backwards, then went airborne. He was propelled higher when he was hit by Ryan Newman, whose hood was destroyed, and flipped airborne into the catch fence. Eight fans were injured, including a woman with a broken jaw; she was airlifted to a nearby hospital. Fourtunatly, Edwards emerged from the car unharmed and like in the movie Talladega Nights, Edwards sprinted on foot over the start-finish line to the cheers of the crowd and with Fox Commentator Mike Joy commenting "shades of Ricky Bobby." Although he did cross the finish line (on foot), he was still handed a DNF.  When Edwards was interviewed on Larry King Live, he responded, "I'm kind of a Will Ferrell fan. He did that at the end of Talladega Nights."

He had a far more successful Nationwide Series season than Sprint Cup Series season, including a win at the NAPA 200 at Montreal. In the race Edwards had a Top 10 position until a final green-white-checker finish put him in third spot on the restart. Edwards passed Andrew Ranger for second and recovered from spinning his tires on the restart to catch up with dominant leader Marcos Ambrose. Edwards was unable to pass the Australian champion until the final turn of the final lap when Ambrose jumped over the curb too high. Edwards passed him and won the race in a big shock to the racing world; a finish considered to be one of the greatest of the sport. Edwards was elated about getting his first road course win at one of the most famous tracks in the world; has said that the Montreal race is his favorite winning performance, and that Marcos had chatted with him that week and taught him about the track during meetings which he credited for his success.

He experienced another winless season in 2009 as his best finish was second at Pocono Raceway. Although Kyle Busch won the Nationwide Series championship, Edwards finished second in the series and scored five wins, finishing 210 points behind the winner.

2010

During a Cup Series race in Atlanta on lap 40, Edwards was tapped by Brad Keselowski and it sent Edwards into Joey Logano and both went up into the wall with damage. 283 laps later with Edwards now 150 laps down on lap 323, Edwards got his retaliation against Keselowski. Edwards spun Keselowski in the tri-oval. Keselowski's car got airborne, flipped over, hit the wall on the roof, and came back on all fours coming to a stop in turn 1. Fox commentators Mike Joy and Darrell Waltrip compared Keselowski's crash to the previous years' Aaron's 499 finish where Keselowski wrecked Edwards in almost the same way. Edwards was parked for the rest of the race and was placed on a three-race probation. Edwards said in his interview that his retaliation didn't go as he had planned that he never expected Keselowski's car to catch air like that but was glad that Keselowski was ok.

Edwards won the first-ever Nationwide Series race at Road America in late June. He followed that up with a controversial win at the first Nationwide race of the season at Gateway, turning Brad Keselowski coming off the final turn to win the race. He won his third Nationwide race of the year at Texas Motor Speedway after dominating the race and a late race restart where he was accused of jumping the start by Kyle Busch.  He would finish the season second in points for the third year a in a row.

Edwards' season was a slow start in 2010. Going into Daytona in July, he was in danger of missing the Chase while barely running in the Top 12 in points. The whole Roush Fenway team marks Chicagoland as the turning around point for the organization, where Edwards would finish second to David Reutimann. Edwards performance increased from this point, with him winning the pole at Watkins Glen and Richmond, and leading laps at Atlanta and Richmond.

On November 12, 2010, Edwards broke the track-record for the fastest qualifying lap at Phoenix International Raceway scoring his 6th career pole. Carl went on to win the Kobalt Tools 500 on November 14, 2010, with his Aflac Ford Fusion and breaking a 70-race winless streak going on from the 2008 Ford 400 at Homestead. The next weekend, Carl Edwards would qualify second at Homestead, and go on to dominate and win the race with season champion Jimmie Johnson finishing 2nd. The late season rally would take Edwards to fourth in points.

2011

On March 6, 2011, Edwards won the Kobalt Tools 400 at Las Vegas, his only points win of 2011. On May 21, 2011, he won the NASCAR Sprint All-Star Race. On August 4, 2011, Edwards re-signed with Roush Fenway Racing to continue driving his No. 99 Ford Fusion. The deal was reportedly worth over $40 million, with Ford talking Edwards into sticking with Roush Fenway Racing for the rest of his career. It was rumored for many months that Edwards would go over to Joe Gibbs Racing to take over the No. 20 Toyota Camry then driven by Joey Logano. Joe Gibbs was rumored to have offered Edwards an $8 million deal a year with a $10 million signing bonus.

For the rest of the season, Edwards raced with consistency and made the 2011 Chase field. After the Good Sam Club 500, he was in a tight points battle with Tony Stewart, but Stewart won the championship by holding off Edwards to win the 2011 Ford 400. They were tied in points, but Stewart won the tiebreaker, having five wins to Edwards' one. In the Nationwide Series, Edwards contested the full season once again, but was unable to compete for the Drivers' Championship. Due to a scheduling conflict, he was forced to miss the Bucyrus 200 while the Cup Series raced at Infineon. Edwards would win a career high eight races and give Jack Roush the Nationwide Series Owners' Championship.

2012: 3rd Winless Season
In January 2012, Edwards announced that he would not be competing in the Nationwide Series during the 2012 season, concentrating on his Sprint Cup championship effort.

At Texas, Edwards ran well, until he made an unscheduled pit stop to check the lug on the car, sending him back to 30th, but was able to charge through over a course of 234 laps to finish 8th.

On August 11, 2012, Edwards entered and won his only race of the 2012 NASCAR Nationwide season at Watkins Glen. On September 8, 2012 during the race at Federation Auto Parts 400, he finished 17th and missed the chase for the first time since the 2006 season.

2013

In the 2013 Daytona 500, Edwards was caught in a crash in turn one after Trevor Bayne slid, and Edwards was sent into the wall. Edwards led the most laps the following week at Phoenix and prevailed late, the second time he broke a 70-race winless streak at the short track.

On July 6, 2013, at the 2013 Coke Zero 400 he had a good run until turn 2 on the last lap. He got pushed up the track by Marcos Ambrose and created a mini-pileup, putting Edwards at the end of the lead lap. The caution did not fly. The next week, he was 11th most of the day and finished eighth at the 2013 Camping World RV Sales 301.

Edwards won his second race of the year at Richmond in September, assuming the lead on a cycle of pit stops and holding off Kurt Busch in the last laps, earning him an additional three points for Chase seeding. Edwards' win however caused controversy as it was discovered that Edwards jumped in front of leader Paul Menard on a restart to take the lead for the final time; an action that NASCAR gave penalties for in the past. Following the controversy, NASCAR changed the rules to permit anybody to beat the leader to the start-finish line as long as they accelerate past the restart line first.

Though Edwards finished 11th at Chicago and ninth at New Hampshire to start the Chase, his Chase chances were ended with a 35th-place finish at Dover caused by an ill-handling car. He then had a fifth-place finish at Kansas, a 10th-place finish at Charlotte, a 17th-place finish at Talladega, and a 12th-place finish at Martinsville. At Texas, Edwards started on pole and battled Jimmie Johnson for the lead on several restarts, before his engine blew up and he finished 37th. At Phoenix, Edwards and Johnson nearly wrecked each other in turn 1 mid-race but both cars continued on. Edwards ran out of gas with two laps left leading. Edwards finished 21st. He ended the season with a 12th-place finish at Homestead, and a 13th-place finish in the final points standings.

2014: Final Season at Roush

At the 2014 Food City 500, Edwards won a rain-delayed race. He led the last 78 laps.

Weeks later Edwards nearly won the All-Star Race for a second time after starting on pole. However, he was edged by Jamie McMurray for the win as McMurray passed him with 8 laps to go to win the $1M purse. In a post race interview Edwards said "I'm disappointed but Jamie did a good job on the restart. He cleared me and beat me fair and square. My hats off to him. I wish I won but I was just beaten."

In late May 2014, it was rumored that Edwards was leaving Roush's team for good. Edwards kept quiet for months over the rumors. During NASCAR RaceDay, Edwards stated he declined an offer from Richard Childress Racing which made everybody speculate that Edwards already had plans for 2015. On June 19, 2014, Jayski's Silly Season Site stated he heard "that the deal between Edwards and Joe Gibbs Racing is done, no word when it will be announced." On July 27, 2014, RFR announced the 2015 lineup, with Edwards not listed.

On June 22, 2014, Edwards led the final 19 laps of the 2014 Toyota/Save Mart 350 at Sonoma for his 23rd career NSCS win, his first road course win of his career, his second win of 2014 and his final win for Roush.

On the day of the 2014 Brickyard 400, Edwards admitted to the media that he was switching teams in 2015 effective immediately after 2014; but because a rule in his contract forbade him to mention his destination until September, he only mentioned the switch from Roush. According to Jack Roush, the parting was mutual and not because of any falling-out.

2015: First Season At JGR And Crown Jewel Victories

Rumors arose of Edwards potentially joining Joe Gibbs Racing, which were confirmed on August 19, 2014 with Edwards signing a multi-year deal to drive the No. 19 Toyota for the team, a fourth entry for JGR. 

Carl began his season on a low-note, wrecking in the ending of the Daytona 500 and losing the draft late in the race in Atlanta. He rebounded at Las Vegas with a terrific run. While running close to the lead and leading a couple laps, Edwards tangled with Kasey Kahne with less than 20 laps to go. Edwards — while moving under Kahne — knocked Kahne into the SAFER barrier. In an apparent act of retaliation, Kahne forced Edwards out of the draft, wrecking Edwards and himself. Despite the payback, Edwards took responsibility for the collision stating: "I was just racing as hard as I can. It's completely my fault, Kasey did a good job. I just got sucked up into him there off of turn 4 and tore up the right side a little bit and got loose into Turn 1 and that was it... that's definitely my fault. I feel bad for Kasey."

In the Coca-Cola 600  at Charlotte, Edwards took the lead early in the race, fell back, but managed to regain the lead close to the end, and held off former teammate Greg Biffle to win his 24th career win, snapping a 31-race winless streak. In July, he won the pole position for both the 5-hour Energy 301 at New Hampshire and the Brickyard 400 at Indianapolis. At Darlington, Edwards took his second win of the year after rallying back from being two laps down to the leaders.

In the Challenger Round of the Chase, Edwards started with a second-place finish at Chicagoland coming back from a speeding penalty. At New Hampshire, he won the pole position, led 19 laps, and finished fifth. At Dover, Edwards started third and finished 15th. He was eliminated in the Round of 8, but finished fifth in points.

2016: Final season

Edwards parted ways with crew chief Darian Grubb after the 2015 season ended. Dave Rogers was tapped as his new crew chief. Edwards showed strength with his new crew chief, evident when he brought home several Top 10's. Edwards dominated the final laps of the 2016 Food City 500 to win the race after starting on pole. He also dominated nearly the whole race as he led 276 of 500 laps, holding off Dale Earnhardt Jr. and Kurt Busch on four restarts to win the race. On the final lap at Richmond, Edwards won the race after making a last-lap pass on teammate  Kyle Busch, by moving him up the race track. He became the first driver to make a last lap pass in Richmond Speedway's history. This elevated him from sixth in the standings to 3rd. Edwards would qualify for the playoffs and win a rain shortened race at Texas to clinch a spot in the Championship 4 race at Homestead–Miami Speedway Homestead-Miami Speedway. Because the race was shortened by rain, Edwards did not do his signature back-flip. In the final race at Homestead-Miami Speedway, he was hooked by championship rival Joey Logano on a restart with ten laps remaining, ending his hopes of winning a Cup Series championship. The championship would be won by Jimmie Johnson for the seventh time in his career. This would be Edwards' last Cup Series race to-date.

On January 9, 2017, FOX Sports reported Edwards planned to step away from NASCAR to pursue other opportunities; Daniel Suárez replaced him in the 2017 season. In his retirement press conference on January 11, 2017, Edwards said, “I don’t have a life raft I’m jumping onto, I’m just jumping. And in a way, that makes it easier. This is a pure, simple, personal decision.”

Other racing
On June 6, 2007, Edwards won the 2007 Nextel Prelude to the Dream at the Eldora Speedway. The Prelude is a dirt late model race organized in part by Tony Stewart, owner of Eldora, to benefit the Victory Junction Gang Camp and other worthy causes. Over 20 Nextel Cup drivers participated in the heat races and 30-lap feature, along with other drivers from different forms of motorsports. Edwards started second in the feature and held off Kyle Busch and Jeff Gordon to win.

Edwards participated in the 2008 Race of Champions, partnered with Tanner Foust. While in the individual event Edwards faced 7-time Formula One Champion Michael Schumacher and defeated him. In the next round, however, Edwards was defeated by eventual runner-up  David Coulthard.

In popular media
Edwards appeared on The Price Is Right, where he presented both showcases on the episode which aired on November 10, 2009. The Showcases were NASCAR-themed, with a trip to the Coca-Cola 600 and a Camping World trailer featured in one Showcase, while the other featured the debut of a new garage door prop for the "ultimate garage" Showcase that featured tools and a hybrid version of his Ford Fusion racer. Previously, Edwards had appeared in a small guest role during the fifth season of the hit Fox drama series 24.

He played in the annual Taco Bell All-Star Legends and Celebrity Softball Game in 2009 at Busch Stadium in St. Louis. During the game he sported a Boston Red Sox cap because of the affiliation his race team Roush Fenway Racing has to the owners of the Boston Red Sox.

Edwards guest hosted on WWE Raw on February 8, 2010. Edwards also appeared a few weeks before the 2012 Daytona 500, saying to John Cena that he could wave the green flag for the start of the race; weather postponing the race to Monday kept Cena from doing so as he had to honor a WWE commitment in Portland.

In 2015, Edwards was a NASCAR on NBC guest analyst for the Xfinity Series race at Richmond. In 2016, Edwards was a Fox NASCAR guest analyst for the Xfinity Series race at Texas.

Edwards has a cameo appearance as a West Virginia state trooper in the 2017 film Logan Lucky. He also had a cameo appearance in Chicago Fire as a pizza delivery driver in the fourth season episode "2112". He would also make an appearance in the music videos for Justin Moore's 2011 song "Bait a Hook" and Sara Evans' 2013 track "Slow Me Down".

Personal life

Edwards would give a business card to other teams for his services before getting a ride with Roush Racing. Off the track, Edwards has been busy promoting his new record label, Back 40 Records, a company he started with a high school friend back in Columbia, Missouri. During the week of the Auto Club 500, Edwards participated in taping of the Fox television series 24, where he played Homeland Security Agent Jim Hill. Edwards was raised a Christian but refuses to talk about religion publicly and refuses to answer religion-connected questions when interviewed.

He was rumored to be considering a run against Claire McCaskill for her U.S. Senate seat in 2018, however decided not to run. Josh Hawley defeated McCaskill in that Senate race.
He was also reportedly floated as a potential nominee for the open Missouri U.S. Senate seat in 2022.

Family
Edwards and Katherine "Kate" Downey were married January 3, 2009. The couple have two children, Michael and Anne.

He is a first cousin once removed to fellow driver Ken Schrader, who told Edwards early in his racing career to get dirt track experience before going to Cup; he would later take the advice. In light of this relationship, Edwards is often referred to as "Cousin Carl." During a visit to the USS Constitution Museum in 2016, Edwards revealed that his great-great-great grandfather is Rutherford B. Hayes, the 19th President of the United States.

Athleticism
Edwards is popular among fans for celebrating his wins by doing a backflip off his car (or truck), a style of celebration he took from sprint car driver Tyler Walker. Seizing on the popularity of Edwards' trademark celebrations, Ford ran several "Overactive Adrenaline Disorder" commercials in 2006 featuring a "young Carl" performing backflips in his baby crib, off a couch, and off a doctors exam table. Edwards also appeared in a This is SportsCenter commercial when he tried to excite anchor Neil Everett following a bad show. He has appeared in Aflac Commercials with the Aflac duck when Edwards was sponsored by Aflac, from 2009 to 2011.

He is also dedicated to fitness by biking and long distance running off the track, but also his sponsors, which included Subway and Vitamin Water. He also appeared on "Eat Smart, Move More" Campaign ads in 2007.

Motorsports career results

NASCAR
(key) (Bold – Pole position awarded by qualifying time. Italics – Pole position earned by points standings or practice time. * – Most laps led.)

Sprint Cup Series

Daytona 500

Nationwide Series

Craftsman Truck Series

 Season still in progress.
 Ineligible for series championship points.

Rolex Sports Car Series
(key) (Races in bold indicate pole position, Results are overall/class)

References

External links

 
 
 Back40 Records 

Living people
1979 births
Sportspeople from Columbia, Missouri
Racing drivers from Missouri
NASCAR drivers
NASCAR Xfinity Series champions
Rolex Sports Car Series drivers
Missouri Republicans
University of Missouri alumni
Rock Bridge High School alumni
RFK Racing drivers
Joe Gibbs Racing drivers
USAC Silver Crown Series drivers